"Missing You" is a song by American R&B singer Case. It was produced by Tim & Bob and released in February 2001 as the lead single from the album Open Letter. The song was also included in the soundtrack to Nutty Professor II: The Klumps. The song itself is a cover of the same song done by Joe the year before and originally appeared on the European Version of his 2000 album My Name Is Joe. The hit song spent four weeks at number-one on the US R&B chart.

The song was covered by George Benson on his album Irreplaceable.

Charts

Awards and nominations
Grammy Awards
2002, Best R&B Vocal Performance - Male (nominated)

References

2001 singles
Songs written by Bob Robinson (songwriter)
Songs written by Tim Kelley
Song recordings produced by Tim & Bob
2001 songs
Music videos directed by Sanaa Hamri
Songs written for films
Case (singer) songs
Def Jam Recordings singles
Contemporary R&B ballads
Pop ballads
Torch songs
2000s ballads